A trefoil arch, or three-foiled cusped arch, is an arch incorporating the shape or outline of a trefoil – three overlapping circles. It has been widely used for its symbolic significance in Christian architecture. Trefoil arches are common in Gothic architecture for portals and decoration. Trefoil or "trilobed" arches are also a characteristic feature of decorated portals in late Fatimid architecture and Mamluk architecture in Egypt, from approximately the 12th to 16th centuries.

Arches and vaults

See also 

 Multifoil arch

References